Hemieuryalidae is a family of echinoderms belonging to the order Amphilepidida.

Genera:
 Actinozonella Stöhr, 2011
 Astrogymnotes H.L.Clark, 1914
 Hemieuryale von Martens, 1867
 Ophiochondrus
 Ophioholcus Clark, 1915
 Ophioplocus Lyman, 1861
 Ophioplus Verrill, 1899
 Ophiozonella Matsumoto, 1915
 Ophiozonoida H.L.Clark, 1915
 Quironia A.H.Clark, 1934
 Sigsbeia Lyman, 1878

References

Amphilepipida
Echinoderm families